The ancient Chinese term  ("return; reversion; inversion") is a basic concept of Daoism. The Daodejing says "Reversal is the movement of the Way ... Being is born from nonbeing." Daoist texts use fan in three interconnected meanings: "return to the root", "cyclical return", and "return to the contrary". In Chinese cosmology, everything in the universe emerges from the primordial Dao, continually transforms, and inevitably returns to it, which parallels the eternal return in philosophy or cyclic model in physical cosmology. Fan is also significant in Chinese alchemy and Daoist meditation.

Terminology
The common Chinese word  is semantically complex. A dictionary of pre-modern Chinese lists five translated meanings:

 turn over, invert, turn upward
 turn back, reverse, go back, revert, return, turn round; repeat, do again
 go counter to, contrary, opposite, oppose; rebel, revolt
 look inside, introspection
 on the contrary, nevertheless; despite (the foregoing)

The second meaning is also unambiguously written  with a "radical-phonetic character" combining the same  phonetic element with the "go" radical ( or ).

Axel Schuessler's dictionary of Chinese etymology reconstructs Old Chinese *panʔ for fǎn "to turn; return; turn around; turn against; rebel; on the contrary; however", which is cognate with fàn < *pans "to trade", fān < *phan "a turn; a time; turn; change", and probably pán < *bân "turn around". The Sino-Tibetan etymology is evident in Tibetan pʰar  "interest (on money); exchange" and Lepcha far "price" and par "buy".

Related terminology 

Early Daoist texts use fan with two near synonyms. Guī has translation equivalents of: "1. Return home; return whence one came, originally or recently; go back to, retreat to; come full circle; recede; withdraw. 2. Take refuge with, as though going home; bring allegiance to; find haven with, resort to. 3. A daughter going to her new home in marriage. 4. Give back, return to its proper place or owner; restore, make restitution...". Fù ( or  ["tautologically enlarged " (Karlgren) by the "footstep" radical ]) translates as meaning: "1. Go back over the same road, retrace; return, repair to; repeat(edly), duplicate; again, once more; resume restart, start over... 2. Return to earlier state, restore, renew. 3. Reply to, respond... 7. "Return" name of 24th hexagram of Yijing."

Fan and huan both have the significance of "reaction" or "return", as "when some kind of reverse change takes place as the result of a former action, or when a cyclical process brings back the phenomena to a state similar to that at the beginning, or identical with it."

Daodejing
In the classic Daodejing the terms fǎn, guī, and fù share the semantic field of "reversal; return; reversion; renewal". The philologist Victor H. Mair says that all three "suggest the continual reversion of the myriad creatures to the cosmic principle whence they arose", which corresponds with the philosopher Mircea Eliade's "myth of the eternal return".

Fan occurs four times in the Daodejing:

Fan expresses the idea of reversal. Things constantly changing into their opposites, winter turns into summer, day into night, similar to yin-yang processes: yin becomes yang, yang again becomes yin. It is the cyclical motion of history and natural processes, implying that things and situations eventually change into their counterparts.

Fu occurs fourteen times in eight sections of the text. Six occurrences are in the word fùguī ("return"), which is a compound of two synonyms.

The remaining occurrences are simply of fu alone.

Fu or fugui is a return to one's origin, as in the biblical saying "... for dust thou art, and unto dust shalt thou return" (Genesis 3:19). It expresses the transitory nature of all existence; beings appear, exist for a while, and then disappear to make room for new beings.

Gui occurs eleven times in the Daodejing, including the six fùguī ("return") and guī qí gēn ("return to its roots") mentioned above.

The Chinese philosopher and historian Fung Yu-lan said that fan "reversion" and fu "return" refer to the greatest of all the laws underlying phenomenal change: "if any one thing moves to an extreme in one direction, a change must bring about an opposite result".

Zhuangzi
The  Zhuangzi reiterates the Daodejing concerning the importance of returning or reversing.

Fan ("return") occurs 90 times in the text, such as:

The text uses the "return" synonyms fu, gui, and fugui 50, 34, and 2 times, respectively. The Zhuangzi mentions the Daodejing theme of "returning to the root", "origin", or "beginning".

Two chapters mention "returning to the simplicity of the unhewn log" (cf. Daodejing 28 above).

Huainanzi
The  Huainanzi ("[Writings of] the Huainan Masters"), a collection of essays by scholars in the court of Liu An, Prince of Huainan. It quotes from many pre-Han schools of thought, including Huang–Lao Daoism, Confucianism, and Legalism.

Fan ("return; revert; reversion") is a "key concept" in the Huainanzi. The text conceives all cosmic and human realms in terms of the basic benmo ("root and branch", i.e., "fundamental and peripheral") framework in which any move from a "branch" state back toward a "root" state is marked as a "return" or "reversion." First, on a cosmic level, fan characterizes the Dao itself, as all phenomena tend over time (through death, decay, or destruction) to revert to the undifferentiated root from which they emerged. Second, on a human level, the return or reversion process can unlock great potential power in the adept of Daoist cultivation.

The Huainanzi uses several near-synonyms with fan ("to return; to turn") referring to the Daoist doctrine of "returning to one's original, undifferentiated nature", a pervasive theme that occurs more than ninety times in fifteen of the twenty-one chapters. They include fanji ("return to the self"), fanben ("return to one's root"), fanxing ("return to one's nature"), and fan qi chu ("return to one's beginning"). Non-differentiation refers to the "perfect beginning before distinction, division, multiplicity and separateness emerged: everything was smoothly and harmoniously blended into one compact whole; everything was simultaneously 'together'."

The Huainanzi describes the ability of a zhenren ("genuine/true person") to "return to the origin — the state of primordial undifferentiation, the perfect beginning before things appeared as distinct and separate".

The text frequently transfers specific attributes of the Daoist zhenren genuine person to the sage ruler. For instance, the Huainanzi says:

Even though the text asserts that certain changes, such as developments in human social and political institutions, are not ultimately reversible, it concedes that effective governance depends upon political leaders returning to the root by through personal cultivation.

Daodejing (16) "Heaven's creatures abound, but each returns to its roots []" is quoted in one Huainanzi passage:

Interpretations
The French sinologist Isabelle Robinet analyzed how commentators and interpreters broadly understand fan in three interrelated meanings: "return to the root", "return cyclically", and "return to the contrary".

 Return to the root 
First, fan indicates "returning to the root or beginning". Guigen ("going back to the root") is a basic Daoist expression, as seen in the Daodejing and Zhuangzi above. In a literal sense, "fan is the root" (Heshang Gong), it is "to return to the root" (Lin Xiyi), and "to return to the beginning" (Deng Yi). In contexts that identify the Dao with the human spirit or nature, Shao Ruoyu speaks of fan "returning xin ("spirit") to the interior", Li Yue suggests "to return to the empty spirit," and Su Che says "to return to xing ("nature")". An early example of this first meaning is the  Guodian Chu Slips manuscript entitled Taiyi Shengshui (The Great One Generated Water), which states that Water, after being generated, returns (fan) to the Great One (Taiyi) [] to assist it in forming Heaven.

The Daodejing translator D. C. Lau refuted the usual interpretation that fan "turn back" in "turning back is how the way moves" refers to endless cycles of development and decline; Something weak inevitably develops into something strong, but when this process reaches its limit, the opposite process of decline sets in and what is strong once again becomes something weak, until decline reaches its lowest limit only to give way once more to development. Lau reasoned that if change is cyclic and a thing that reaches the limit in one direction will revert to the opposite direction, then the central Daoist precept that "To hold fast to the submissive is called strength" becomes both "useless" because if both development and decline are inevitable, the purpose of the former is to avoid latter, and "impracticable" because it advocates that we should remain stationary in a world of incessant change. Instead of "cyclic return", Lau reinterpreted fan to mean "return to one's roots". The Daodejing says that once a thing has reached the limits of development, it will inevitably return to its roots and decline, but says nothing about redevelopment being equally inevitable after the return.

 Return cyclically 
Second, Robinet cited a Chinese cosmogonic interpretation is that fan means "cyclic return; beginning anew", referring to the reversal of a force that, when it arrives at its apogee, then declines, due to a complementary force in cyclical alternation "like a ring" (e.g., Chen Xianggu, Zhang Sicheng, and Lin Xiyi). On a phenomenological level, fan is the rhythm of life's movements. When something has grown to its ji ("utmost point"), it decreases or reverses to its contrary, as do Yin and Yang or night and day. For instance, the Liezi says, "Death and life are one [time] going and one [time] returning", and the Yijings Xici (Appended Statements) explains that the Dao is "one [time] Yin and one [time] Yang." The first and second meanings are essentially identical (Lin Xiyi's commentary gives both), but in different realms. For the universe, fan denotes returning to its cosmic Origin, the Dao, or the Void. Analogically, for people, fan is returning to the original Void that is the basis for their xing ("individual nature").

Norman J. Girardot says the Dao is a living thing that follows a "law of cyclic return", which manifests creative activity and life-giving force. Beginning in its primordial condition of hundun chaos, the Dao "goes out" (shi  or chu ) giving birth to all phenomenal things, finally reaching an "apogee" (yuan  or jiao ) of movement, at which point it reverses itself and "returns" (fan) to its beginning state. The "life" of the Dao is generated by and returning in on itself, going out and coming back in a spontaneous and creative way characterized by its ziran (lit. "self-so") freedom of movement.

According to the Encyclopædia Britannica, the Return to the Dao is one of the most important basic concepts of Daoism: within the universe's rhythmic fluctuations and transformations, all things eventually return or revert to the Dao from which they emerged.

Return to the contrary 
Third, Robinet said fan can metaphysically mean "return to the contrary initial state", by which the cause of a thing is not the same as the thing itself, but rather its opposite. Wang Bi says "in movement, if we know that there is non-being (wu ), all things interpenetrate". He also describes fan as the "Dao of ziran", which is to say that it is a natural law of motion for renewing the source. Lu Xisheng says fan is the reversal that form begins from the formIess. Fan has different ontological meanings according to whether it refers to our closed world, in which everything is finite and forever reverses to its opposite or initial state, or refers to the absolute Dao that is infinitely void and limitless, transcending changes and reversals.

The sinologist Bryan W. Van Norden says fan "reversal" in the Daodejing is the fact that things tend to change over to their opposites, for example, "things may be diminished by being increased, increased by being diminished". Another context asks a rhetorical question about ji (}, "limits; extremes") to illustrate the unpredictability of reversals. "It is on disaster that good fortune perches; It is beneath good fortune that disaster crouches. Who knows the limit? There is no straightforwardness. The straightforward changes once again into the crafty, and the good changes once again into the monstrous." Van Norden says any conscious effort to anticipate changes in the world is doomed to failure, because no one knows the "limits" or points at which reversal will occur. One should instead avoid self-conscious thinking and rely on mystical insight into the Dao. He agrees with D. C. Lau that cyclical change is not inevitable, the Daodejing says disaster "crouches" beneath good fortune, but it does not "necessarily follow" it. For instance, it is possible that a person can overcome the strong by being weak, yet avoid becoming strong themself, while maintaining wuwei, for "reversal is the movement of the Dao."

A professor of Chinese philosophy and religion says notion of fan suggests not only the need to "return" to the Dao, but also that the Daoist way of life would inevitably "appear the very opposite of 'normal' existence, and that it involves a complete revaluation of values".

Eric Sean Nelson philosophically interprets fan ("reversal") as "unending transversal without a terminating synthesis". The Dao is characterized by motility and reversibility, "reversal is the dao'''s movement", but reversibility does not end with the first fan reversal, whether it is a return to the root, nature, or the origin. "All reversal is itself further reversible, as the source returns to and moves toward itself repeatedly without finality or a concluding synthesis." The dialectic of non-identity and the mutuality of opposites means that reversal can be infinitely transversed.

 Daoist alchemy and meditation 
Cosmogenic reversion or inversion (fan , huan ) is central to Chinese alchemy, which comprises elixir-compounding waidan ("external alchemy") and psychophysiological neidan ("internal alchemy"). Notions range from a general fan ("returning") to cosmic unity to more specific guigen ("returning to the root") or huanyuan ("returning to the origin"). Huanyuan in Daoist neidan is equated with the goal of returning to one's benxin ("original mind") in Chan Buddhism.

 Waidan 
External waidan alchemy conceives of the cosmos as the outcome of spontaneous processes. Daoist cosmogony typically involves the progression from Nonbeing to Oneness, followed by the emergence of the yin and yang principles, which join in generating and differentiating the myriad beings. Inversion, return, or reversion to the original state can be achieved by reversing the cosmogonic process through re-enacting its developmental stages in inverse order. These notions are the basis for all main waidan practices. Through cyclical refining and smelting, the alchemical ingredients revert to their original condition, and yield their jing ("pure essences"). This In this way, the cosmos is restored to its original, timeless state, allowing the adept to gain access to the corresponding state of timelessness or immortality.

 Neidan 
Internal neidan alchemy uses cosmological language both to explain the fundamental cosmic configurations and to guide adepts to a primordial order, with the belief that inverting the cosmogonic process will fan ("return") to the pre-cosmological state of existence. Daoist mystics not only ritually and physiologically adapt themselves to the alternations of nature, but are said to create an internal void that permits them to return to nature's origin.

 Returning to the embryo 
"Return" is an essential term in Daoist neidan alchemical literature, for example, the term fantai ("returning to the embryo") refers to mentally repeating one's embryonic development, emphasizing "the return of the physical freshness and perfect vital force of infancy, childhood, and even fetal life". As mentioned above, the Daodejing (28, cf. 55) says, "If eternal integrity never deserts you, You will return to the state of infancy", which suggests that "human vitality is fully charged upon parturition and constantly discharges with every natural cycle of breath". Returning to the origin, the womb, or the embryo implies the idea of "rebirth and renewal as a kind of countercurrent to ordinary life".

 Physiological alchemy 
One of the most central ideas in physiological alchemy is "retracing one's steps along the road of bodily decay"; in addition to the above fan and huan meaning "regeneration; reversion", other technical terms include xiu ("restoration"), xiubu ("repair"), and fu ("replenishment"). A related neidan theory is making certain bodily fluids, particularly products of the salivary and testicular glands, flow in a direction opposite to the usual, which is expressed by such terms as niliu or nixing. Authors of Daoist alchemical texts repeatedly give cosmogony as the chief example for the process of shun ("continuation"), a series of stages that lead to degeneration and ultimately to death, whereas neidan is based on the opposite notion of ni ("inversion"). The ultimate task of a neidan alchemist is to diandao ("turn upside down") the normal processes of the cosmos.

 Hui 
In neidan terminology, huixin ("turn one's heart toward") means "to convert", while huijing ("reverse the sperm/essence") connotes flowing against the current and refers to a Daoist sexual practice that supposedly "makes the essence go up" into the brain. Hui is synonymous with fan ("turn back; reverse"), exemplified by the chengyu idiom huiguang fanzhao ("to reverse one's light and turn back one's gaze", colloquially meaning "last glow before sunset").

 Meditation 
In Daoist meditation, fan ("return; turn back; revert") takes on a more technical meaning in terms such as fanzhao ("turn back one's light" of sight) or fanting ("turn back one's hearing"), both of which denote turning one's attention and perceptions inwardly.  Fanzhao figuratively means "turn back one's gaze; turn one's sight inward", which neidan adepts practice in order to "illuminate the plethora of anthropomorphized cosmic elements that make up the inner pantheon".

 Non-Daoist traditions 
Besides Daoist inner alchemical texts, the notion of turning inward (fan  or ) is also prevalent in Buddhist and Confucian traditions. For example, the Ming dynasty Neo-Confucian Zhou Rudeng (1547–1629) urged his followers to practice a number of contemplative practices: self-reflection (fansi ; fanzhao ), inner contemplation (fanguan ), and self-regulation (zi tiao ).

 References 

 Sources 

 
 
 
 
  
 
 
 
 
 
 
 
 
 
 
 
 
 
 
 
 
 
 
 
 
 

 External links 
The Tao as a Path, Stephen W. Sawyer
Daoism, Stanford Encyclopedia of Philosophy''

Chinese culture
Chinese philosophy
Chinese words and phrases
Taoist philosophy